Sedis may refer to :

Sedis Bàsquet, a women's basketball team of La Seu d'Urgell, Spain
Sedis, French chain manufacturer owned by Tube Investments of India Limited since 2010